The 1920–21 season was Al-Mokhtalat SC's 10th season of football, The club won the 1920–21 Sultan Hussein Cup.

Squad

1920–21 Sultan Cup

References

Zamalek SC seasons